Razborca is a settlement in the Pohorje Hills in the Municipality of Mislinja in northern Slovenia. The area is part of the traditional region of Carinthia. It is now included in the Carinthia Statistical Region.

References

External links
Razborca on Geopedia

Populated places in the Municipality of Mislinja